"The World Is Waiting for the Sunrise" is a post-World War I popular song, with lyrics by American actor Eugene Lockhart, and music composed by Canadian-born concert pianist Ernest Seitz in 1918. He later claimed he conceived the refrain when he was 12 years-old. Embarrassed about writing popular music, Seitz used the pseudonym "Raymond Roberts" when the song was published on January 24, 1919, by Chappell & Co. Ltd., London, UK.

Early Recordings and Success 
The earliest documented recordings came in 1921. On March 9, Charles Hackett of Columbia Records recorded 3 takes in New York, but they were not released, and are assumed lost. Then, on July 5, at Edison Records New York Studio, Edward Allen and Arthur Middleton (both vocalists), accompanied by Allen's Orchestra, also recorded three takes, with two released on Edison 80667 10" disc. On December 21, 1921, at Victor's Church Studio in Camden, New Jersey, Victor recording artist John Steel cut a 10" disc, Victor 18844, that was released the following March, with some degree of success, reaching number 4 on the Popular music chart.

The most successful early recording of the song took place in the summer of 1922 (the exact date has been lost), when aspiring composer and band leader, Isham Jones, along with his popular dance Orchestra, recorded two instrumental sides for Brunswick Records in New York City (the B-side was "Eleanor"), released in October on Brunswick 2313.

Jones was well into a hot streak started in July 1921, when "Make Believe" hit number 5 in July 1921. Then Jones reached the number 1 spot twice, first with "Wabash Blues" in January 1922 (for six weeks), and again in June for another four weeks, with his own composition, "On the Alamo". After "My Honey's Lovin' Arms" peaked at number 4, "The World Is Waiting For The Sunrise" was released in October, becoming the band's fifth straight top 5 single. It entered the National  Charts on November 11, 1922, for a six-week run, peaking at the number 2 position. It ranked as the number 19 single for year 1922.

It turned out Isham Jones was just getting started, not only as a recording artist, but as a future Hall-of-Hame composer. In the next two years, four of his compositions occupied the top spot for 20 total weeks. "Swingin' Down the Lane", "Spain", "It Had to Be You" and "I'll See You in My Dreams" cemented Jones' standing as one of the top three bandleaders of the 1920s, overshadowed by Paul Whiteman, and perhaps Ben Selvin.

Revival by Les Paul and Mary Ford 
Isham Jones took ""The World Is Waiting for the Sunrise" to its highest position in 1922, but he was forced to share the record in 1951. Les Paul and Mary Ford also took it to the number 2 position, though they did this thirty years later. Les Paul, innovator of guitar designs and multitrack recording techniques, recorded "The World Is Waiting" with his wife, Mary Ford, on vocals, during July 1951 for Capitol Records, Los Angeles. Thanks to their own television show, as well as an appearance on Ed Sullivan August 19, it reached number 2 for two straight weeks in October.

This promotional clip provided by The Ed Sullivan Show, filmed on August 19, 1951, of Les Paul and Mary Ford performing "The World Is Waiting For The Sunrise", answers questions about the popularity of their act, as well as this song, both which became a phenomenon that fall.

Legacy
More than one hundred recorded versions have been commercially released. Initially, when the song's hopeful sentiment appealed to audiences in the post-World War I era, it was recorded by both singers and instrumentalists, including Morton Downey, Fritz Kreisler, and Ted Lewis. Later, as a popular vehicle for improvisation, it was recorded by many jazz musicians, among them Benny Goodman, Duke Ellington, Django Reinhardt, Mel Powell, Jess Stacy, Jack Teagarden and Cuban mambo master Machito. It has also become something of a standard in bluegrass music, being recorded by such popular artists as the Seldom Scene, Raymond Fairchild, and the inimitable Don Reno.

The Beatles (then The Quarrymen), recorded a home version on a Grundig tape recorder in April or May, 1960.  The Beatles version featured guitars by Harrison and Lennon and vocals from Paul McCartney. Canadian jazz musicians to record the song include Bert Niosi (1946), Peter Appleyard (1957), Ed Bickert (1979), and Oscar Peterson (1980). A version by doo-wop group the Larks is featured in the 1955 film Rhythm and Blues Revue.

Takeshi Terauchi & Bunnys recorded an instrumental version of the song on their 1967 album, The World Is Waiting For Terry.

One of the most memorable covers of the song was done by Stan Laurel in the Laurel and Hardy film The Flying Deuces (1939), as Laurel takes the bed strings and plays the song on it like a harp. It was an ironic gesture as the boys, who joined the French Foreign Legion, were caught deserting and were to be shot at dawn.

The song is also referenced in Tennessee Williams's play The Glass Menagerie as the music heard emanating from the Paradise Dance Hall across the alley from the Wingfields' tenement building. The dance hall represents the outside world that Tom hopes in some ways to join.

The Les Paul and Mary Ford version of the song appears in a teaser video released by American band The Voidz to promote their album Virtue. The video was directed by Warren Fu.

See also
List of pre-1920 jazz standards

References

External links
Sheet music for "The World is Waiting for the Sunrise", New York: Chappell and Co., Inc. 1919.

Pop ballads
1919 songs
1951 singles
1910s jazz standards
Benny Goodman songs
Songs of World War I